Gilles-William Goldnadel (born 1954) is a French and Israeli lawyer, author and columnist.

Early life
Gilles-William Goldnadel was born on 12 January 1954 in Rouen, in northern France. He is a secular Ashkenazi Jew. His father. Henri Goldnadel, was of Polish Jewish descent, while his mother, Victoria Schwartz, is of Russian Jewish descent.

Goldnadel grew up in Gournay-en-Bray, where they owned a clothing store. He was educated at the Lycée des Bruyères in Rouen. He received a master's degree in Law from Pantheon-Sorbonne University.

Career
Goldnadel is a lawyer. He has defended Israeli businessman Arcadi Gaydamak and Italian journalist Oriana Fallaci, among many others. In 1996, he defended Maurice Arreckx. In 2014, he defended Patrick Buisson, former President Nicolas Sarkozy's advisor. In 2015, he defended Florian Philippot, a French politician, against the absolute monarchy of Qatar.

An author, Goldnadel has written eight books, three of which with Jean-Claude Gawsewitch. In 2011, he wrote the preface of Vendée : du génocide au mémoricide by Reynald Secher, suggesting the War in the Vendée led to a genocide. He is also a columnist, writing for Le Figaro and Valeurs Actuelles, two conservative French publications. He protects freedom of speech in French media. In a March 2015 column in Le Figaro, he suggested antisemitism and islamophobia were not comparable.

Philanthropy
Goldnadel first visited Israel in 1971. He serves as the President of the Association France-Israël. He has served on the Steering Committee of the CRIF since 2010. He is a zionist, and supports Israeli Prime Minister Benjamin Netanyahu. He is a member of The Republicans.

Personal life
Goldnadel became an Israeli citizen in 2000. He is married to Béatrice Vonderweidt, a former model, now a painter whose work was exhibited at the French Institute of Tel Aviv in 2008. She is a gentile. They reside in Neuilly-sur-Seine, near Paris. They also have homes in Palermo, Italy, and Tel Aviv, Israel. They have a son, Benjamin, and a daughter, Laura-Sarah, both of whom are Israeli citizens and residents.

Bibliography
Une idée certaine de la France (Paris: France-Empire, 1998).
Le Nouveau Bréviaire de la haine (Paris: Ramsay, 2001).
Les Martyrocrates (Paris: Plon, 2004).Conversation sur les sujets qui fâchent avec Alexandre Adler (with Jean-Claude Gawsewitch, 2008).Le Blognadel (Paris: Éditions de Passy, 2009).Sans concessions. Conversations avec David Reinharc, avec Pascal Boniface (Paris: Éditions David Reinharc, 2010).Réflexions sur la question blanche (with Jean-Claude Gawsewitch, 2011).Le vieil homme m'indigne !'' (with Jean-Claude Gawsewitch, 2012).

References

External links
Official blog

Living people
1954 births
Lawyers from Rouen
People from Neuilly-sur-Seine
University of Paris alumni
20th-century French lawyers
French columnists
Israeli lawyers
Israeli columnists
Israeli Ashkenazi Jews
French Ashkenazi Jews
French Zionists
French non-fiction writers
French bloggers
Male bloggers
French people of Polish-Jewish descent
French people of Russian-Jewish descent
French emigrants to Israel